is a town located in Hiyama Subprefecture, Hokkaido, Japan.

As of September 2016, the town has an estimated population of 3,925, and a density of 24 persons per km2. The total area is 162.55 km2.

Geography
Otobe is located on the western of the Oshima Peninsula and faces the Sea of Japan.

The name came from Ainu word that means "The river with a marsh in its estuary". This river is Hime River, which flows through the town.

Neighboring towns
 Hiyama Subprefecture
 Esashi
 Assabu
 Oshima Subprefecture
 Yakumo

History
1902: Otobe became a Second Class Village.
1965: Otobe Village became Otobe Town.

Education
 Junior high school
 Otobe Junior High School
 Elementary schools
 Otobe Elementary School
 Sakaehama Elementary School
 Meiwa Elementary School

References

External links

Official Website 

Towns in Hokkaido